Physcaeneura panda, the dark-webbed ringlet, is a butterfly of the family Nymphalidae. It is found in South Africa, it is common and widespread in the hot dry savanna of KwaZulu-Natal, Eswatini, Mpumalanga, Gauteng, Limpopo and North West.

The wingspan is 34–38 mm for males and 35–39 mm for females. Adults are on wing from September to May (with a peak in late summer).

The larvae probably feed on Poaceae species. Larvae have been reared on Ehrharta erecta and Pennisetum clandestinum.

References

Butterflies described in 1847
Satyrini